The 4th Company is a 2016 Mexican crime film directed by Mitzi Vanessa Arreola and Amir Galván Cervera. The film was named on the shortlist for Mexico's entry for the Academy Award for Best Foreign Language Film at the 89th Academy Awards but it was not selected. The 4th Company won the Ariel Award for Best Picture at the 59th Ariel Awards. Netflix distributed the film from 6 April 2018, but it subsequently departed the service in April 2021.

Cast
 Adrian Ladron as Zambrano
 Andoni Gracia as Combate
 Hernán Mendoza as Palafox
 Gabino Rodríguez as Quinto
 Darío T. Pie as Florecita
 Manuel Ojeda as Chaparro
 Carlos Valencia as El Tripas
 Raymundo Reyes Moreno as Burrero

Reception
On review aggregator website Rotten Tomatoes, the film holds an approval rating of 100%, based on 8 reviews, and an average rating of 6.7/10.

References

External links
 

2016 films
2016 crime films
2010s Spanish-language films
Best Picture Ariel Award winners
Mexican crime films
2010s Mexican films